Bela Whipple Jenks (July 18, 18491930) was a Michigan politician.

Early life
Jenks was born on July 18, 1849 in Schroon Lake, New York to parents Jesse L. and Mary Jane Jenks. Jenks was of Welsh ancestry. His family later moved to St. Clair, Michigan.

Career
On November 8, 1904, Jenks was elected to the Michigan Senate where he represented the 20th district from January 4, 1905 to 1908. Jenks was a member of the Michigan Republican State Central Committee in 1911.

Personal life
Jenks married Alma "Allie" Stafford in Memphis, Michigan on July 18, 1871. Together they had four children.

Death
Jenks died in 1930.

References

1849 births
1930 deaths
Republican Party Michigan state senators
American people of Welsh descent
20th-century American politicians
People from Essex County, New York
People from St. Clair, Michigan